Kalkalya is a former Maidu settlement in Butte County, California. Its precise location is unknown.

References

Former settlements in Butte County, California
Former Native American populated places in California
Maidu villages